Srđan Kljajević (Cyrillic: Crђaн Kљajeвић; born 23 November 1974) is a Montenegrin goalkeeping coach and former player.

Club career
Born in Titograd, Kljajević began playing football with the youth side of FK Bokelj. He played for FK Zeta, before joining Greek Superleague side Panachaiki F.C. in July 2002. He would next play for fellow Superleague club Egaleo F.C., before moving to Serbian FK Rad Belgrade and already back in Montenegro, FK Grbalj. Since the winter-break of the 2009–10 season, he has been playing with FK Kom.

References

External links
 Profile at Srbijafudbal.

1974 births
Living people
Footballers from Podgorica
Association football goalkeepers
Serbia and Montenegro footballers
Montenegrin footballers
FK Zeta players
Panachaiki F.C. players
Egaleo F.C. players
FK Rad players
OFK Grbalj players
FK Mornar players
FK Kom players
Montenegrin First League players
Super League Greece players
Serbia and Montenegro expatriate footballers
Expatriate footballers in Greece
Serbia and Montenegro expatriate sportspeople in Greece